Rein Gilje (born 17 May 1959 in Flekkefjord) is a Norwegian sprint canoeist who competed in the mid-1980s. At the 1984 Summer Olympics in Los Angeles, he was eliminated in the semifinals of the K-2 500 m event.

References
Sports-Reference.com profile

External links

1959 births
Canoeists at the 1984 Summer Olympics
Living people
Norwegian male canoeists
Olympic canoeists of Norway
People from Flekkefjord